The Girl from Dabancheng, also known as "", is a popular Uyghur folk song about the Uyghur youth's yearning for a beautiful woman named Qemberxan.

In 1938, it was adapted into Mandarin Chinese by Wang Luobin and was sung in Lanzhou under the title "Song of the Coachman". It became the first Uyghur folk song translated into Chinese in modern China. Later, Wang Luobin's lyrics were modified and the work was renamed "The Girl from Dabancheng"; some had renamed it to "The Girl from Hangzhou" with the scenery in the south of the Yangtze River. The song was later adapted in various forms. One performance of the song won an award in Pyongyang, North Korea in 2001.

One of the early recordings of the song was done by a German ethnomusicologist on the singing of a Turpan Taranchi farmer's 16-year-old daughter. The song was most likely composed by a Uyghur soldier back in the time of Yaqub Beg, when the soldier was posted from southern Xinjiang to the north (Ili) or east (Turpan). Indeed, there are many songs dated back that time associated with a soldier's courtship, such as Havagul (mispronounced and adapted by Wang Luobin as Avargul), which talks about a girl in Ili. However, "Qemberxan" talks about a girl in Dabancheng (or Davanching in the Uyghur language) which lies between Turpan and Urumqi, and is a district of Urumqi. This district is well known as an entrepot on inter-oasis travel. The reputation of the beauty of local girls is partly due to the mixing among the different populations that traveled through it.

Lyrics

Uyghur original

Lyrics by Wang Luobin

English Translation 
The soil of the Davanching is hard
But the water melon is sweet
My darling is in Davanching
Qambarhan is so sweet.
Qambarhan’s hair is so long

It touches the ground
Please ask darling Qambarhan
Does she want to get a husband.
My tiny pearls spilled on the ground
Please help me to pick them up

I’d like to kiss you, but can’t reach
Please bow your head down.
One can ride a horse
Around icy mountains.
One tortures a good soul

By an evil man
It is hard to see
No matter how hard I look.
The separation with Qambarhan.
Is extremely hard to endure

References 

Chinese folk songs
Year of song unknown
Songs about China
Songs about East Asian people
Songwriter unknown
Uyghur culture